Eva Berneke (born 22 April 1969) is a Danish engineer and company executive. Since January 2022 she is the CEO of Eutelsat.

Biography

Early life and education
She graduated from DTU - Technical University of Denmark, where she obtained a master's degree in mechanical engineering in 1992. She also holds an MBA from INSEAD, obtained in 1995.

Career
She began her career as a consultant and partner at McKinsey in France. In 2007, she joined TDC, the main Danish telecommunications company, where she held the positions of Chief Strategy Officer in the "Mobiles" subsidiary, TDC A/S, Mobile Nordic and became Vice-Executive President until 2014.  She then became in March 2014 Managing Director of KMD, initially a local Internet provider, which became under her leadership the leading Danish software and multi-sector IT solutions company, and subsidiary of the Japanese group NEC.   

On January,1, 2022, she took over the general management of Eutelsat, the French satellite company. She is selected by a headhunter. Its main mission is to ensure the transition of the company from its main activity (the "video" transmission for the editors of television channels) to connectivity (Internet, services to businesses, administrations, the army, the research). She considers that the traditional space industry based on geostationary satellites, of which Eutelsat is one of the main representatives, is compatible with the new generation of "constellation" satellites such as OneWeb, in which Eutelsat became a shareholder in 2021 and which deploys an unprecedented constellation of 650 mini-satellites in low orbit to provide internet services.

She is a member of the board of two iconic Danish companies, Lego and wind turbine manufacturer Vestas Wind Systems, and of the National Bank of Denmark. She is also a member of the Board of Directors of the French École polytechnique.

Less than two months after taking office as Chief Executive Officer of Eutelsat, Eva Berneke is facing the significant crisis for the company posed by Russia's invasion of Ukraine on February 24, 2022. Russia is indeed an important market and partner for the French company which achieved 6.3% of its turnover there in 2020/2021. OneWeb is forced to cancel its scheduled March 4 launch of 36 satellites on one of Russia's Soyuz rockets after the Russian space agency Roscosmos demanded a guarantee that the technology is not used for military purposes and that the British government sells its stake in the company.

But it is above all the question of the continuation of activities with the two Russian pay-TV platforms, NTV Plus (subsidiary of Gazprom Media Holding) and Trikolor which is the subject of criticism. These two platforms broadcast the main state channels (Rossiya 1, Perviy Kanal and NTV) to 15 million Russian households, but also, from the beginning of March, they interrupted the transmissions of eight international news channels. The first criticisms come from the Ukrainian press, then take on an international dimension following the action of the Denis Diderot Committee, which publishes a report and a petition asking for European sanctions against the two Russian customers of Eutelsat. The personal responsibility of Eva Berneke is questioned in the Danish press. Faced with the absence of a break with the Russian propaganda machine that Eva Berneke's position signifies, the influential journalist Birgitte Ehradtsten even goes so far as to question the solidarity between women. Consultant John Strand is even harsher: "As CEO of Eutelsat, Berneke had two choices: leave Russia or stay and support Putin. Berneke not only rejects the direction of the moral compass, but supports Putin's war by censoring information as it requires". Eva Berneke responds to her criticisms by invoking the neutrality to which her company is bound and by indicating that it is up to French and European regulators to take decisions on possible sanctions in relation to the two platforms. The Denis Diderot Committee recognizes that the Code of Ethics of Eutelsat S.A. does indeed imply this principle of neutrality but notes that the Russian platforms do not respect the principles of pluralism enshrined in the Convention of the intergovernmental organization EUTELSAT IGO, that the main channels broadcast by the two platforms contain war propaganda or even incitement to genocide and that Eva Berneke has obviously not asked the regulators to allow the termination of contracts with her two problematic clients. In July 2022, the Reporters sans Frontières association also urged the leaders of Eutelsat to put an end to the collaboration with Russian propaganda.
On July 18, 2022, the Ukrainian Minister of Culture Oleksandr Tkatchenko challenges his French counterpart Rima Abdul-Malak on the question

After the unofficial announcement of the merger between Eutesalt Communications S.A. and Oneweb, an Indian source indicated that Eva Berneke will remain as CEO. The merger should not impact the collaboration between Eutelsat S.A. and its Russian clients. The UK government has obtained a to veto sales of services that pose a risk to UK national security but it is understood that the UK government hopes to evade criticism by ensuring OneWeb technology is ringfenced in a way that ensures it is not used to support channels that facilitate Kremlin propaganda.

Awards and recognition  
In 2019, she received the Womenomics award which distinguishes Danish women managers.

References 

Danish engineers
Women engineers
1969 births
Living people
Women chief executives
Technical University of Denmark alumni
INSEAD alumni
Danish chief executives

Danish expatriates in France